The Schlossplatz (Palace Square or Castle Square) forms the center of the historic Old Town of Wiesbaden, Hesse, Germany. It gets its name from the Stadtschloss, the royal residence of the Dukes of Nassau located on the north side of the square. Other buildings surrounding the Schlossplatz include the Old City Hall, the New Town Hall and the Marktkirche. In the middle of the square stands the Marktbrunnen (Market Well) of 1753. Due to this unique building ensemble, and the fact that at this point medieval Wiesbaden originated, it is historically the most important part of the city. Occasionally it is referred to as the "market square", its name before the palace was built.

The Schloßplatz was officially written as a proper noun using the letter 'ß' in the old German orthography. However, it was also correct to spell the word in new orthography as "Schlossplatz", which it often is.

Literature 
 Baedeker Wiesbaden Rheingau, Karl Baedeker GmbH, Ostfildern-Kemnat, 2001, 
 Gottfried Kiesow: Das verkannte Jahrhundert. Der Historismus am Beispiel Wiesbaden. Deutsche Stiftung Denkmalschutz, 2005, 
 Peter Schabe: Felix Genzmer – Stadtbaumeister des Historismus in Wiesbaden, Historische Kommission für Nassau, 1996

External links 

 Stadt Wiesbaden
 Marktkirche Wiesbaden
 Hessischer Landtag

Wiesbaden